Moorangoorang is a rural locality and a civil parish of County of Napier in the central western part of New South Wales, Australia.  The parish has three railway stations, Mooren,  Borah and Pimbra.

References

Localities in New South Wales
Geography of New South Wales
Central West (New South Wales)